Gutieri Tomelin (born June 29, 1991), is a Brazilian professional footballer who plays as a centre-back for Israeli Premier League club Hapoel Nof HaGalil.

Honours
Joinville
Brazilian Série B: 2014

External links
 
 

1991 births
Living people
Brazilian footballers
Association football central defenders
Figueirense FC players
Duque de Caxias Futebol Clube players
Joinville Esporte Clube players
Jagiellonia Białystok players
NK Osijek players
Hapoel Nof HaGalil F.C. players
Campeonato Brasileiro Série A players
Campeonato Brasileiro Série B players
Ekstraklasa players
Croatian Football League players
Israeli Premier League players
Brazilian expatriate footballers
Expatriate footballers in Poland
Expatriate footballers in Croatia
Expatriate footballers in Israel
Brazilian expatriate sportspeople in Poland
Brazilian expatriate sportspeople in Croatia
Brazilian expatriate sportspeople in Israel